There are sixteen national parks in Spain: eleven in the Iberian Peninsula, four in the Canary Islands and one in the Balearic Islands. Twelve of the seventeen autonomous communities of Spain have national parks. Canary Islands has the most (four), followed by Andalusia, Castile-La Mancha and Castile and León (two each). There are five autonomous communities that have no national parks: Basque Country, La Rioja, Murcia, Navarre, Valencian Community.

 about 15 million people visited Spain's national parks, with Teide accounting for about 28% of all visitors. The second most visited park was Picos de Europa (17%), followed by Ordesa y Monte Perdido (13%). The least visited parks were Cabrera Archipelago (0.81%) and Cabañeros (0.72%). With more than 2.5 million visitors in 2013, Teide was the most visited national park in Europe that year, and sixth most visited in the world.

National parks

See also
 List of national parks of Spain and their relationship to sites of community importance
 Ministry of Environment (Spain)
 Natural park (Spain)
 Àrea natural d'especial interès — protected areas in the Balearic Islands

References

External links

An introduction to the new Sierra de las Nieves National Park
 
Spain's National Parks (in English)

 
Spain
National parks
 National parks
National parks